The Office of Policy Coordination (OPC) was the covert operation wing of the United States Central Intelligence Agency (CIA). Created as a department of the CIA in 1948, it actually operated independently until October 1950. OPC existed until 1 August 1952, when it was merged with the Office of Special Operations (OSO) to form the Directorate of Plans (DDP).

History
OPC was preceded by the Special Procedures Group (SPG), whose creation in March 1948 had been authorized in December 1947 with President Harry Truman's approval of the top-secret policy paper NSC4-A. SPG was located within the CIA's Office of Special Operations (OSO), the CIA department responsible for intelligence collection, and was first used to influence the Italian election of 1948, a policy success which demonstrated that psychological/political warfare could be the key to winning the Cold War. OSO, the successor to the Strategic Services Unit (SSU), was headed by an Assistant Director for Special Operations (ADSO). CIA's expanded mandate caused jealousy in the State Department and the Department of Defense. When OPC was created, it inherited all of SPG's resources, including more than $2 million. It also acquired funds and labor projects from the Economic Cooperation Administration (ECA).

On 18 June 1948, Truman approved NSC10/2 which created the Office of Special Projects. George F. Kennan, the director of the State Department's Policy Planning Staff, was the key figure behind its creation. Before the agency started operating on 1 September 1948 it was renamed to the Office of Policy Coordination. The name change was in anticipation of public scrutiny; the new name would better deflect away attention from the covert activities. Frank Wisner from the State Department was chosen to be the first director.

Control over the new entity was highly contentious. Although formally a department of the CIA, it was responsible to the State Department, and DCI Roscoe H. Hillenkoetter (1947–1950) exercised no authority over the OPC. According to the historian Gregory Mitrovich, OPC effectively "became an intelligence apparatus for the departments of state and defense". The OPC was brought under the control of the CIA on 12 October 1950, days after Hillenkoetter was replaced by Walter Bedell Smith, when the new DCI simply announced that he was in charge of the OPC. After taking control over the OPC, Smith became concerned about the size of OPC's covert operations, which had been vastly expanded in accordance with NSC 68. Smith feared that the added responsibility would undermine CIA's primary function, namely the collection of intelligence.

OPC became embroiled in organizational rivalry with OSO, with which there was operational overlap, even though OSO was focused on intelligence collection rather than action. Smith attempted to ameliorate the situation by appointing Allen Dulles on 4 January 1951 to the new position of Deputy Director for Plans (DDP) where he would supervise the two entities. According to Anne Karalekas, a staffer of the Church Committee who wrote a history of the CIA, that was merely a cosmetic change, and it was only on 1 August 1952 that OPC and OSO was properly merged into the Directorate of Plans (DDP). Wisner, who had replaced Allen on 23 August 1951, assumed the command functions of ADSO and ADPC. According to John Prados, the name was intended to disguise its true function.

Assistant Directors for Policy Coordination
The OPC was headed by the Assistant Director for Policy Coordination (ADPC).

Operational Scope 
Point 5 of the NSC 10/2 defined the scope of "covert operations", which would be overseen by the OPC:

The OPC grew rapidly during the Korean War. In April 1951, President Truman established the Psychological Strategy Board in order to coordinate all US psychological warfare strategy.

Amongst the propaganda mission the psywar staff carried out was the funding of the 1954 Hollywood production of George Orwell's "Animal Farm", which should portray communist domination in an allegorical way.

See also 
Operation Mockingbird
Special Activities Center (CIA)
Directorate of Operations (CIA)
Carmel Offie
Charles W. Thayer
The Belarus secret

Notes

References

External links
NSC 10/2, FRUS
Office of Policy Coordination 1948–1952, a secret history of the OPC declassified in 1997. According to Gregory Mitrovich (2000, p. 195n32), the document was written  1971 by CIA historian Gerald Miller. Another version, published in the Studies in Intelligence in the summer of 1973 but declassified in 2006, is available here, although it is cut short. The latter version describes the document as the "introductory—and summary—chapter" of a "monumental history of OPC: three volumes which total 722 pages with an additional three appendices and another two volumes with 11 attachments."

Defunct agencies of the United States government
United States government propaganda organizations